Neocoenyra gregorii is a butterfly in the family Nymphalidae. It is found in Somalia, Kenya, Uganda, Tanzania, the eastern part of the Democratic Republic of the Congo and Malawi. The habitat consists of montane grassland and forest-grassland mosaic at altitudes up to 3,000 meters and open thorn-bush country and Brachystegia woodland at altitudes from 1,200 to 2,200 meters.

References

Satyrini
Butterflies described in 1894
Butterflies of Africa